The Red Willow Creek is a  tributary of the Republican River in Nebraska. The name is reported to be a mistranslation of the Dakota Indian name Chanshasha Wakpala, which literally means Red Dogwood Creek. The Dakota referred to the creek as such because of an abundance of the red dogwood shrub that grew along the banks.  Its stem and branches are deep red in color, and it is favored in basket making.

See also

List of rivers of Nebraska

References

External links

Rivers of Nebraska
Bodies of water of Lincoln County, Nebraska